Jarred Crous (born 27 June 1996) is a South African swimmer. He competed in the men's 200 metre breaststroke event at the 2016 Summer Olympics. He finished 25th in the heats with a time of 2:12.64 and did not qualify for the semifinals.

References

External links
 

1996 births
Living people
South African male swimmers
Olympic swimmers of South Africa
Swimmers at the 2016 Summer Olympics
Swimmers at the 2014 Summer Youth Olympics
Male breaststroke swimmers